"Colony" is a science fiction short story by American writer Philip K. Dick. It was first published in Galaxy magazine, June 1953. The plot centers on an expedition to an uncharted planet, on which the dominant, predatory alien life form is capable of precise mimicry of all kinds of objects. The size and complexity of the mimicked object can vary from simple doormats to whole spaceships with the larger objects usually attempting to trap and "absorb" humans similar to carnivorous plants.

The story was adapted for radio for the series X Minus One, airing on October 10, 1956.

About the story

In 1976, Dick said:
The ultimate in paranoia is not when everyone is against you but when everything is against you. Instead of "My boss is plotting against me," it would be "My boss's phone is plotting against me." Objects sometimes seem to possess a will of their own anyhow, to the normal mind; they don't do what they're supposed to do, they get in the way, they show an unnatural resistance to change. In this story I tried to figure out a situation which would rationally explain the dire plotting of objects against humans, without reference to any deranged state on the part of the humans. I guess you'd have to go to another planet. The ending of this story is the ultimate victory of a plotting object over innocent people.

References

External links
 
 "Colony" at the Internet Archive
 X Minus One episode 70: Colony at the Internet Archive

Short stories by Philip K. Dick
1953 short stories
Works originally published in Galaxy Science Fiction
Fiction about shapeshifting
Extraterrestrial life in popular culture